This article lists motorcycle riders who have died competing at motorcycle racing events. This article lists rider deaths in all series, at any level.

Isle of Man TT, Manx Grand Prix and Southern 100 
There have been over 275 recorded competitor deaths in the Isle of Man since 1910. Some Isle of Man deaths are included directly below, as the races carried World Championship status until a British Grand Prix was established on short-circuits from 1977.

MotoGP/World Grand Prix Motorcycling Championship

Listed are fatalities of riders in the World Grand Prix Motorcycle Racing Championship races since its foundation in 1949. In total, 104 riders have died from incidents that occurred at Grand Prix motorcycle racing events, with Ben Drinkwater being the first in 1949. Three riders died in the 1940s; twenty-nine in the 1950s; twenty-seven in the 1960s; twenty-four in the 1970s; fourteen in the 1980s; two in the 1990s; one in the 2000s; three in the 2010s; and one in the 2020s. The most recent fatal accident occurred in May 2021 when Jason Dupasquier was killed after a crash during qualifying at the Italian Grand Prix, while the most recent fatal accident to occur in the 500 cc/MotoGP class happened in October 2011, when Marco Simoncelli was killed after he was struck by Valentino Rossi and Colin Edwards during the Malaysian Grand Prix.

Eight Grand Prix motorcycle racing champions have died while racing or practicing in Grand Prix motorcycle racing: Dario Ambrosini in 1951, Leslie Graham in 1953, Rupert Hollaus in 1954, Tom Phillis in 1962, Bill Ivy in 1969, Jarno Saarinen in 1973, Daijiro Kato in 2003, and Marco Simoncelli in 2011. While Hollaus is often credited as the only rider to win the championship posthumously, he had mathematically clinched the 1954 125 cc world championship title, as he had achieved the maximum number of points possible at the time of his death.

Footnotes

By circuit

By decade

Endurance Series

Superbike World Championship
The following riders have been killed in the Superbike World Championship

Other international events

British National or Club Series
There have been over 120 recorded deaths in British motorcycle racing series since 1930.

North West 200 and Irish Road Racing

American Road Racing

American Motocross/Supercross

National Series in Continental Europe

Asian National Series

National Series in South America

Speedway

Auto Race 

American Flat Track 

1 Eklund's accident happened in 1990.  He died in 1991 from his injuries.
2 Halbert's accident happened in 2014. He died in 2015 from his injuries.

Enduro

‡ Ahola's accident happened in 2011. He died in 2012, as a result of injuries sustained.

Dakar Rally

Other rallying events

2001 John Deacon (GBR) Rally France/Jordan
2004 Richard Sainct (FRA) Rallye des Pharaons
2020 Ismael Bonilla (ESP), 41, crashed at Circuito de Jerez

References

Motorcycle racing
Deaths
Deaths
Motorcycle racing
 
Motorcycle racing